Ragueneau is a French surname

Ragueneau may also refer to:
 Ragueneau, Quebec, a parish municipality in Canada
 a fictional male character from Edmond Rostand's play Cyrano de Bergerac